Minuscule 102 (in the Gregory-Aland numbering), α 499 (Soden), is a Greek minuscule manuscript of the New Testament, on paper leaves. Palaeographically it has been assigned to the 15th century. Formerly it was labelled by 99a and 114p.

Description 

The codex contains a complete text of the Acts, Catholic epistles, and Pauline epistles on 111 paper leaves (size ). The text is written in one column per page, 34 lines per page.

It contains summaries of the journeys of St. Paul and his death (as in 206, 216, 256, 468, 614, 665, and 909, 912).

According to Scrivener the manuscript was "carelessly written".

Aland the Greek text of the codex did not place in any Category.

History 

According to the colophon it was written in 1444 by Theognostus, metropolitan of Perga and Attalia. The colophon states:

μετροπολιτου περγης και ατταλειας θεογνωστου, υπερτιμου  και εξαρχου της κενης δευτερας παμφυλιας. εν ατταλου τη μητροπολει αμβλυωπων. Αρχιερευς νειλος.

In 1547 it was presented to the Iviron monastery at Mount Athos, where it was housed until 1655.

It was examined by Matthaei.

It is currently housed at the State Historical Museum (V. 412, S. 5), at Moscow.

See also 

 List of New Testament minuscules
 Biblical manuscript
 Textual criticism

References

Further reading 

 Leo Allanus, De libris ecclesiasticis Graecorum, Paris 1644, p. 53.

Greek New Testament minuscules
15th-century biblical manuscripts